Birmingham was a parliamentary constituency of the House of Commons of the Parliament of the United Kingdom for the city of Birmingham, in what is now the West Midlands Metropolitan County, but at the time was Warwickshire.

Boundaries and History

Until 1832, excepting for the single year 1275, Birmingham was only represented in Parliament as part of the county constituency of Warwickshire.

It became a Parliamentary borough in its own right following the passage of the 1832 Reform Act and remained a single constituency electing two members of parliament until it was divided in 1885.

The 1832 Reform Act introduced a uniform borough franchise on top of ancient franchise rights in existing Parliamentary boroughs: (see the Unreformed House of Commons for a list of the different franchises in each borough). As new boroughs, like Birmingham, had no ancient franchise holders only the new franchise rules applied to them.
Seymour explains that:-

Only one class of new rights was created by the act of 1832. This was the £10 occupation qualification. According to the act, the franchise was granted to all male persons who for a year before registration had occupied as owner or tenants "any house, warehouse, country house, shop or other building, either separately or jointly with any land" of a clear yearly value of £10. The land must be within the electoral limits of the borough; and in order to qualify, the occupier must have been rated in respect of such premises, to all rates for the relief of the poor; and he must have paid at the time of registration all rates and taxes due from him the preceding April. 
This occupation franchise was the characteristic of the borough franchise after 1832. As ownership furnished the ordinary qualification for franchise in the counties, so in the boroughs, occupation, actual or constructive, was the basis of the suffrage. While however, in the counties no provision was made for ascertaining the true value or bona fide rent which was to qualify for the franchise; in the boroughs, assessment to the taxes was embodied with the condition of value, and actual payment was super-added. There was another difference between the character of the county and borough franchises, as determined by the Reform Act. In the latter no claimant could be registered as a voter if he had received parochial relief within the past twelve months; in the counties, no disqualification was attached to the receipt of poor-relief. ...

From 1832 to 1868 the constituency returned two members, but the Representation of the People Act 1867 conferred a third seat from the 1868 United Kingdom general election. However the 1867 Act also introduced the limited vote restricting electors in three member constituencies to casting a maximum of two votes.

A way in which the limited vote system may fail to achieve its end of minority representation, is if the largest party is very well organised and is able to arrange the distribution of its supporters vote for maximum advantage. Charles Seymour explained the reaction of the Liberals of Birmingham after the limited vote was enacted.

The Liberals of Birmingham realized that if they were to retain the third seat, their vote must be divided economically between the three candidates.
To prevent waste of votes, an organization must be built up which could control absolutely the choice of the elector; and each elector must vote invariably as he was told. The success of the Birmingham organization, which soon became known as the Caucus was unbroken and no Conservative candidate was returned. It was copied in many other constituencies and inaugurated a new era in the development of party electoral machinery, the effect of which upon the representative system has been profound.

The area was split into seven single-member constituencies in 1885; Birmingham Bordesley, Birmingham Central, Birmingham East, Birmingham Edgbaston, Birmingham North, Birmingham South and  Birmingham West.

Members of Parliament
Constituency created (1832)

Third member added (1868)Constituency abolished (1885)Elections

Note: When the exact number of electors voting is unknown, turnout is estimated on the basis of dividing votes cast by two. To the extent that electors did not use both their possible votes, turnout will be underestimated.

Elections in the 1830s

Elections in the 1840s
 Resignation of Attwood by accepting the office of Steward of the Chiltern Hundreds 

 Death of Scholefield

 Note (1847): 5,110 electors voted. Scholefield was classified (for this election) as a Radical, as was Allen. (Source: Stooks Smith)

Elections in the 1850s

 Death of Muntz.

 

Elections in the 1860s

'Death of Scholefield

 

 

 Appointment of Bright as President of the Board of Trade

Elections in the 1870s
 Appointment of Bright as Chancellor of the Duchy of Lancaster

 Resignation of Dixon

Elections in the 1880s

 94635

Appointment of Bright as Chancellor of the Duchy of Lancaster and Chamberlain as President of the Board of Trade

 Constituency abolished 1885

References

Sources
 British Parliamentary Election Results 1832–1885, compiled and edited by F.W.S. Craig (Macmillan Press 1977)
 Electoral Reform in England and Wales, by Charles Seymour (David & Charles Reprints 1970) originally published in 1915, so out of copyright The Parliaments of England by Henry Stooks Smith (1st edition published in three volumes 1844–50), second edition edited (in one volume) by F.W.S. Craig (Political Reference Publications 1973) originally published in 1844–50, so out of copyright Who's Who of British Members of Parliament: Volume I 1832–1885'', edited by M. Stenton (The Harvester Press 1976)

Politics of Warwickshire
Parliamentary constituencies in Warwickshire (historic)
Parliamentary constituencies in Birmingham, West Midlands (historic)
Constituencies of the Parliament of the United Kingdom established in 1832
Constituencies of the Parliament of the United Kingdom disestablished in 1885